Bheki is a masculine given name. It is also encountered as an abbreviation or shorthand for Bhekokwakhe, Bhekizizwe, Bhekumuzi. Notable people with the name include:

Bheki Cele (born 1952), the South African Minister of Police (2018-)
Bheki Dlamini, acting Prime Minister of Swaziland (2008 to 2008)
Bheki Hadebe, a South African politician 
Bheki W. J. Langa, a South African diplomat
Bheki Lubisi (born 1986/1987), a South African politician
Bheki Maphalala, the Chief Justice of the Kingdom of Eswatini
Bheki Mtolo, a South African politician 
Bheki Mseleku (1955 – 2000), a South African jazz musician
Bheki Ntuli (1957 –  2021), a South African politician
Bheki Ntuli (eThekwini politician), a South African politician
Bheki Ntshalintshali, a South African trade union leader
Bheki Radebe (born 1965), a South African politician
Bheki Sibiya (born 1973), a South African actor
Bheki Shabangu (born 1985), a South African association football player

Bantu-language given